Louis Burton Lindley Jr. (June 29, 1919 – December 8, 1983), better known by his stage name Slim Pickens, was an American actor and rodeo performer. Starting off in the rodeo, Pickens transitioned to acting and appeared in dozens of movies and TV shows. For much of his career Pickens played mainly cowboy roles; he is perhaps best remembered today for his comic roles in Dr. Strangelove (riding the atomic bomb to its target), Blazing Saddles and 1941, and his villainous turn in One-Eyed Jacks with Marlon Brando.

Early life and rodeo work 
Louis Burton Lindley Jr. was born in Kingsburg, California, the son of Sally Mosher (née Turk) and Louis Bert Lindley Sr., a Texas-born dairy farmer. Young Lindley was an excellent horse rider from an early age. Known as "Burt" to his family and friends, he grew bored with dairy farming and began to make a few dollars by riding broncos and roping steers in his early teens. His father found out and forbade this activity, but Lindley took no notice, went to compete in a rodeo, and was told by the doubtful rodeo manager that there would be "slim pickin's" (i.e. little chance of any prize money) for him. To prevent his father from discovering that he had competed, he entered his name as Slim Pickens, and won $400 that afternoon.

Lindley graduated from Hanford High School, Hanford, California, and was a member of the Future Farmers of America (FFA). He joined the rodeo, billed as Slim Pickens, and eventually became a well-known rodeo clown. During World War II, he enlisted in the United States Army Air Forces. Reportedly when the recruiter asked him his profession, he responded "Rodeo". This was misread on a form as "radio", and he spent his entire enlistment at a radio station in the Midwestern United States.

Film career
After nearly 20 years' rodeo work, Pickens's wide eyes, moon face, strong physical presence, and distinctive country drawl gained him a role in the Western Rocky Mountain (1950), which starred Errol Flynn. He appeared in many more Westerns, playing both villains and comic sidekicks to actors such as Rex Allen.

Hollywood made good use of Pickens' rodeo background. He did not need a stand-in for horseback scenes, and he was able to gallop his own Appaloosa horses across the desert, or drive a stagecoach pulled by a six-horse team. In a large number of films and TV shows, he wore his own hats and boots, and rode his own horses and mules.

Pickens appeared in dozens of further films, including Old Oklahoma Plains (1952), Down Laredo Way (1953), Tonka (1959), One-Eyed Jacks (1961, with Marlon Brando), Dr. Strangelove (1964), Major Dundee (1965, with Charlton Heston), the remake of Stagecoach (1966; Pickens played the driver, portrayed in the 1939 film by Andy Devine), An Eye for an Eye (1966), Never a Dull Moment (1968), The Cowboys (1972, with John Wayne), The Getaway (1972, with Steve McQueen), Pat Garrett and Billy the Kid (1973), Ginger in the Morning (1974, with Fred Ward), Blazing Saddles (1974), Poor Pretty Eddie, Rancho Deluxe (both 1975), Beyond the Poseidon Adventure (1979, with Michael Caine and Karl Malden), and Tom Horn (1980, also with McQueen). He had a small but memorable role in Steven Spielberg's 1941 (1979) in scenes with Toshiro Mifune and Christopher Lee; during one scene, he enumerates the objects on his person, similarly to the way he does in the "Survival Kit Contents Check" scene in Dr. Strangelove. In 1978, Pickens lent his voice to theme park Silver Dollar City as a character named Rube Dugan, for a ride called "Rube Dugan's Diving Bell". The diving bell was a simulation ride that took passengers on a journey to the bottom of Lake Silver and back. The ride was in operation from 1978 to 1984. He also played werewolf sheriff Sam Newfield in The Howling (1981).

In 1960, he appeared with William Bendix and Doug McClure in the NBC Western series Overland Trail in the episode "Sour Annie", with fellow guest stars Mercedes McCambridge and Andrew Prine. Pickens appeared five times in NBC's Outlaws (1960–62) Western series as the character Slim. The program, starring Barton MacLane, was the story of a U.S. Marshal in the Oklahoma Territory and the outlaws he pursued. In 1967, Pickens had a recurring role as the scout California Joe Milner in the ABC military Western Custer, which starred Wayne Maunder in the title role.

In 1975, Pickens was in another Western, playing the evil, limping bank robber in Walt Disney's The Apple Dumpling Gang; that same year, the exploitation cult classic Poor Pretty Eddie was released, with Pickens portraying twisted Sheriff Orville. He provided the voice of B.O.B. in the 1979 Disney science-fiction thriller The Black Hole. His last film was his least notable, Pink Motel (1982, with Phyllis Diller).

Dr. Strangelove
Pickens played B-52 pilot Major T. J. "King" Kong in 1964's Dr. Strangelove. Stanley Kubrick cast Pickens after Peter Sellers, who played three other roles in the film, sprained his ankle and was unable to perform in the role due to having to work in the cramped cockpit set. Pickens was chosen because his accent and comic sense were perfect for the role of Kong, a cartoonishly patriotic and gung-ho B-52 commander. He was not given the script for the entire film, but only those portions in which he played a part. Three memorable scenes featuring Pickens were:

 A monologue meant to steel the crew for their duty after he receives the definitive inflight order to bomb a strategic target in the USSR.
 Reading aloud to his crew the contents of their survival kits (possibly the first mention of condoms in a Hollywood film). After listing the contents usable for barter with Russian women (prophylactics, nylons, lipstick, etc.), as well as a .45 semiautomatic pistol, Major Kong said, "Shoot, a fella could have a pretty good time in Big D [Dallas] with all this stuff." This line had to be dubbed over, with the reference to Dallas changed to "weekend in Vegas", after the scheduled November 22, 1963 screening for critics was canceled due to President John F. Kennedy's assassination.
 Best known of all, and an enduring historical film image of the American-Soviet Cold War era, Pickens riding a dropped H-bomb to a certain death, whooping and waving his cowboy hat (in the manner of a rodeo performer bronc riding or bull riding), not knowing its detonation will trigger a Soviet doomsday device.

Pickens credited Dr. Strangelove as a turning point in his career. Previously he had been "Hey you" on sets, and afterward he was addressed as "Mr. Pickens". He once said, "After Dr. Strangelove, the roles, the dressing rooms, and the checks all started gettin' bigger." Pickens said he was amazed at the difference a single movie could make. However, he also said that working with Stanley Kubrick proved too difficult due to Kubrick's perfectionist style of directing with multiple takes for nearly every shot, especially with the climactic H-bomb riding scene, which was done in just over 100 takes. In the late 1970s, Pickens was offered the part of Dick Hallorann in Kubrick's adaptation of Stephen King's The Shining, but Pickens stipulated that he would appear in the film only if Kubrick was required to shoot Pickens' scenes in fewer than 100 takes. Instead, Pickens' agent showed the script to Don Schwartz, the agent of Scatman Crothers, and Crothers accepted the role.

Voice work and recordings
Pickens lent his voice to the 1975 studio recording of Bobby Bridger's collection of Western ballads A Ballad of the West, in which he narrated part 1, "Seekers of the Fleece", the story of Jim Bridger and the mountain man fur-trade era. In 1977, he released the self-titled country album, Slim Pickens, on Blue Canyon Records. The LP contained twelve selections (including Kinky Friedman's "Carryin' the Torch", which was issued as a single) and two songs written by Pickens. The record jacket featured a photo of the actor in his signature role in Dr. Strangelove, sitting in the cockpit. Pickens also recorded a one-off single, "Christmas in November" (a rather depressing number about a child who won't live to celebrate Christmas on time), on the Midsong label in 1980.

Television
Pickens appeared in numerous television guest shots, including a 1954 Stories of the Century episode in which he played the Sundance Kid to Joe Sawyer's Butch Cassidy, as well as four episodes of the syndicated Western series Annie Oakley (1956, with Gail Davis and Brad Johnson), a 1956 episode of The Lone Ranger, and three episodes of NBC's Wide Country (1962), a rodeo series starring Earl Holliman and Andrew Prine. In 1961, he had a recurring role as Johnson in the 17-episode NBC series The Americans, the story of how the American Civil War divided families. Thereafter, he was cast in a first-season episode of NBC's espionage series The Man from U.N.C.L.E..

He appeared in episodes of Mannix, Cheyenne, Sugarfoot, Alfred Hitchcock Presents, The Lone Ranger, Frontier Doctor, Gunsmoke, Route 66, The Tall Man, Maverick (in several episodes playing different characters), The Westerner, Riverboat, The Fugitive, The Travels of Jaimie McPheeters, The Legend of Jesse James, Alias Smith and Jones, Daniel Boone, The Virginian, Night Gallery, That Girl, Baretta, Vega$, How the West Was Won, Cimarron Strip, and Kung Fu.

Pickens was cast in recurring roles in Custer, Bonanza, Hee Haw (where he was a semiregular from 1981 until his death), B. J. and the Bear with Greg Evigan, and Filthy Rich. He played Wild Jack Monroe, the owner of station WJM, in CBS's The Mary Tyler Moore Show, and also guest-starred as Zeke in the 1963 episode "Higgins and the Hillbilly" of the ABC sitcom Our Man Higgins, which starred Stanley Holloway as a British butler for a suburban American family. Pickens portrayed Grandpa Shoenfield in a two-part 1980 episode of ABC's The Love Boat.

In an episode of CBS's Hawaii Five-O he portrayed the patriarch of a family of serial killers.

Pickens emceed NBC's short-lived country music variety series The Nashville Palace in 1981.

Awards
In 1982, Pickens was inducted into the Hall of Great Western Performers at the National Cowboy & Western Heritage Museum in Oklahoma City.

In 1986, Pickens was honored by the Rodeo Historical Society during his posthumous induction into the Rodeo Hall of Fame at the National Cowboy & Western Heritage Museum.

In 2005, Pickens was posthumously inducted into the ProRodeo Hall of Fame in Colorado Springs for his work as a rodeo clown.

In 2006, Pickens was inducted into the Pendleton Round-Up and Happy Canyon Hall of Fame.

In 2020, Pickens was inducted into the Ellensburg Rodeo Hall of Fame in Washington.

Personal life
In his last years, Pickens lived with his wife in Columbia, California. He died on December 8, 1983, after surgery for a brain tumor. He was survived by his wife and children, Thomas Michael Lindley and Margaret Louise Wittman (née Lindley) as well as his step-daughter he chose to raise as his own, Daryle Ann Giardino (née Lindley). His funeral was held at Presbyterian Church of the Forty Niners in Columbia, California, where he was a member. His ashes were scattered over his favorite trail areas. His wife died in 2011.

His brother Samuel (1921–2001) was also an actor with the stage name Easy Pickens. Slim was a longtime supporter of the National Rifle Association (NRA), appearing in promotional shots. He was an avid outdoorsman, appearing in several episodes of The American Sportsman.

Cultural References
The album "Days Go By" (2012) by The Offspring features the song "Slim Pickens Does the Right Thing and Rides the Bomb to Hell" (Track 12, 2:36) which harkens back to his final scene from Dr. Strangelove.

Filmography

Smoky (1946) as Rodeo Cowboy, uncredited
Rocky Mountain (1950) as Plank (CSA)
Colorado Sundown (1952) as Joshua Slim Pickens / Ma Pickens
The Last Musketeer (1952) as Slim Pickens
Border Saddlemates (1952) as Slim Pickens
The Story of Will Rogers (1952) as Dusty Donovan
Old Oklahoma Plains (1952) as Slim
South Pacific Trail (1952) as Slim Pickens
Thunderbirds (1952) as Pvt. Wes Shelby
Old Overland Trail (1953) as Slim Pickens
The Sun Shines Bright (1953) as Sterling, Lanky Backwoodsman
Iron Mountain Trail (1953) as Slim Pickens
Down Laredo Way (1953) as Slim
Shadows of Tombstone (1953) as Slim
Red River Shore (1953) as Deputy Slim Pickens
Phantom Stallion (1954) as Slim
The Boy from Oklahoma (1954) as Shorty
The Outcast (1954) as Boone Polsen
Santa Fe Passage (1955) as Sam Beekman
The Last Command (1955) as Abe
When Gangland Strikes (1956) as Slim Pickett
Stranger at My Door (1956) as Ben Silas
The Great Locomotive Chase (1956) as Pete Bracken
Gun Brothers (1956) as Moose MacLain
Gunsight Ridge (1957) as Hank Moss
The Sheepman (1958) as Marshal
Escort West (1958) as Corporal Wheeler
Tonka (1958) as Ace
Stump Run (1959) as Babe Gaskin
Chartroose Caboose (1960) as Pete Harmon
One-Eyed Jacks (1961) as Deputy Lon Dedrick
A Thunder of Drums (1961) as Trooper Erschick
Savage Sam (1963) as Willy Crup
Dr. Strangelove (1964) as Maj. 'King' Kong
Major Dundee (1965) as Wiley
In Harm's Way (1965) as C.P.O Culpepper
Up from the Beach (1965) as Artillery Colonel
The Glory Guys (1965) as Sgt. James Gregory
Stagecoach (1966) as Buck
An Eye for an Eye (1966) as Ike Slant
The Young Riders (1966)
Un tipo dificil de matar (1967)
Rough Night in Jericho (1967) as Yarbrough
The Flim-Flam Man (1967) as Jarvis Bates
Will Penny (1967) as Ike Walterstein
Never a Dull Moment (1968) as Cowboy Schaeffer
The Legend of Custer (1968) as California Joe Milner
Skidoo (1968) as Switchboard Operator
80 Steps to Jonah (1969) as Scott
Rosolino Paternò, soldato... (1970) as General Maxwell
The Ballad of Cable Hogue (1970) as Ben Fairchild
The Deserter (1971) as Tattinger — American Scout
Temporada salvaje (1971) as Lucky
The Cowboys (1972) as Anse
J.C. (1972) as Grady Caldwell
The Honkers (1972) as Clete
The Getaway (1972) as Cowboy
Pat Garrett and Billy the Kid (1973) as Sheriff Baker
Blazing Saddles (1974) as Taggart
Runaway on the Rogue River (1974) as Bucky Steele
The Gun and the Pulpit (1974) as Billy One-Eye
Bootleggers (1974) as Grandpa Pruitt
Ginger in the Morning (1974) as Sheriff
The Legend of Earl Durand (1974) as Phil Chumley
Rancho Deluxe (1975) as Henry Beige
Poor Pretty Eddie (1975) as Sheriff Orville
The Apple Dumpling Gang (1975) as Frank Stillwell
White Line Fever (1975) as Duane Haller
Banjo Hackett: Roamin' Free (1976, TV movie) as Lijah Tuttle
Hawmps! (1976) as Naman Tucker
Pony Express Rider (1976) as Bob Jay
Mr. Billion (1977) as Duane Hawkins
The White Buffalo (1977) as Abel Pickney
The Shadow of Chikara (1977) as Virgil Cane
The Swarm (1978) as Jud Hawkins
Smokey and the Good Time Outlaws (1978) as Sheriff Ledy
The Sweet Creek County War (1979) as Jitters Pippen
Beyond the Poseidon Adventure (1979) as Dewey 'Tex' Hopkins
The Sacketts (1979) as Jack Bigelow
1941 (1979) as Hollis P. Wood
Spirit of the Wind (1979) as Obie
The Black Hole (1979) as B.O.B. (voice, uncredited)
Tom Horn (1980) as Sheriff Sam Creedmore
Honeysuckle Rose (1980) as Garland Ramsey
Christmas Mountain (1981)
The Howling (1981) as Sam Newfield
This House Possessed (1981, TV movie) as Arthur Keene
Pink Motel (1982) as Roy

Television

The Lone Ranger (1956) — episode — The Letter Bride — Ed Jones
The Lone Ranger (1956) — episode — The Sheriff of Smoke Tree — Joe Boley
Sugarfoot (1957) — episode — Brannigan's Boots — Shorty
Sugarfoot (1958) — episode — Short Range — Harry
Cheyenne (1957) — episode — Big Ghost Basin — Gary Owen
Lassie (1957) — episode — The Chimp — Eddie
Walt Disney's Wonderful World of Color (1957–1974) — 19 episodes — various roles
Death Valley Days (1958) — episode — The Telescope Eye — Season 6 Episode 26
Wagon Train (1958) — episode — The Tent City Story — Rafe Jeffers
Maverick (1958) — episode — The Spanish Dancer — Jed
Frontier Doctor (1959) — episode — Bittercreek Gang — Slim
Bronco (1961) — episode — One Came Back — 1st Stage Driver (uncredited)
The Americans (1961) — episodes — The Escape, and The War Between the States — Johnson
Maverick (1961) — episode — A State of Siege — Stage Coach Driver
Wagon Train (1962) — episode — The Eve Newhope Story — Grubstake Malloy
Route 66 (1962) — episode — A long Piece of Mischief — Jud
Alfred Hitchcock Presents (1961) — episode — Final Arrangements — Bradshaw
Alfred Hitchcock Presents (1964) — episode — The Jar — Clem Carter
Bonanza (1963–1964) — Episodes: "Half a Rogue" and "King of the Mountain" as Big Jim Leyton
Rawhide (1964) — episode — The Backshooter — Sheriff McKay
The Fugitive (1964) — episode — Nemesis — Corbin
Gunsmoke (1964) — episode — Once a Haggen — Bucko Taos
The Virginian (1964) — episode — Big Image — Little Man — Hogy
The Man from U.N.C.L.E. (1964) — episode — The Iowa-Scuba Affair — Clint Spinner
Daniel Boone (1964 TV series) — Simon Harman – S2/E18 "The Deserter" (1966)
Daniel Boone (1964 TV series) — Cletus Mott - S3/E1 "Dan'l Boone Shot a B'ar" (1966)
Gunsmoke (1966) — episode — Sweet Billy, Singer of Songs — Pony Beal
The Legend of Jesse James (1966) — episode — Wanted: Dead and Only — Sheriff Homer Brinks
Cimarron Strip (1968) — episode — Fool's Gold — Malachi Grimes
Gentle Ben (1968) — episode — Ol' Joe's Gotta Go — Lloyd Larkin
Bonanza (1968) — Episode: "Catch as Catch Can" as Sheriff Gant
That Girl (1969) — episode — Nobody Here But Us Chickens — Major Culpepper
Mannix (1969) — episode — Only Giants Can Play — Mike Ray
Ironside (1969) — episode — Goodbye to Yesterday — Sheriff Metcalf
Bonanza (1970) — episode "What Are Pardners For?" as Sheriff
Gunsmoke (1970) — episode — The Scavengers — Colley
The Mary Tyler Moore Show (1971) — episode — The 45-Year-Old Man — Wild Jack Monroe
Alias Smith and Jones (1971) — episode — Exit from Wickenburg — Mike
Alias Smith and Jones (1971) — episode — The Man Who Murdered Himself — Sheriff Benton
Alias Smith and Jones (1971) — episode — The Day They Hanged Kid Curry — Sheriff Whittaker
The Partridge Family (1972) — episode — Nag, Nag, Nag — Will Fowler
Gunsmoke (1972) — episodes — The River: Parts 1 & 2 — Charlie Utter
Alias Smith and Jones (1972) — episode — The Strange Fate of Conrad Meyer Zulick — Sheriff Sam
Hawaii Five-O (1973) — episode — One Big Happy Family — Sam
Night Gallery (1973) — episode — Die Now, Pay Later — Sheriff Ned Harlow
Kung Fu (1974) — episode — Empty Pages of a Dead Book — Bart Fisher
McMillan & Wife (1976) — episode — Greed — William Halstead
The Life and Times of Grizzly Adams — episode — The Unholy Beast — Fine Hope
How the West Was Won (1978) — Episodes: #1.9, #1.10, and #1.11 — Tap Henry
Vega$ (1978) — episode — Yes, My Darling Daughter — Ben Handler
B.J. and the Bear (1979–81) — episodes — Snow White and the Seven Lady Truckers: Part 2, Mary Ellen, and B.J. and the Seven Lady Truckers — Sgt. Beauregard Wiley
The Misadventures of Sheriff Lobo (1979) — Run for the Money: Parts 2 & 3 — Sgt. Wiley

See also

List of people with brain tumors

References

External links
 
 
 The Colt Revolver in the American West – Slim Pickens' Single Action Army
 Slim Pickens arrives at an airport 1970s from Texas Archive of the Moving Image

1919 births
1983 deaths
Male actors from California
American clowns
American male film actors
Male Western (genre) film actors
American male television actors
American male voice actors
Deaths from brain cancer in the United States
People from Kingsburg, California
Rodeo clowns
20th-century American male actors
ProRodeo Hall of Fame inductees
American male comedy actors
American Presbyterians
United States Army personnel of World War II